Jakub Rada (born 5 May 1987) is a Czech footballer who plays for Hradec Králové as a midfielder.

Rada has made several appearances in the Czech First League for SK Kladno, Bohemians 1905 and Mladá Boleslav. In 2019 he won the Slovak Cup with FC Spartak Trnava. He was an unused substitute in the final.. In June 2019 he rejoined Bohemians 1905

International career
Rada received his first call up to the senior Czech Republic squad in March 2016 for a friendly against Scotland.

Honours 
Spartak Trnava
 Slovak Cup: 2018–19

References

External links

Living people
1987 births
Association football midfielders
Czech footballers
Czech Republic international footballers
Footballers from Prague
AC Sparta Prague players
SK Kladno players
ŠK Slovan Bratislava players
Bohemians 1905 players
FK Mladá Boleslav players
FC Spartak Trnava players
FC Hradec Králové players
Czech First League players
Czech National Football League players
Expatriate footballers in Slovakia
Czech expatriate sportspeople in Slovakia